Paleosiberian (or Paleo-Siberian) languages or Paleoasian  (Paleo-Asiatic)  (from  , "ancient") are several linguistic isolates and small families of languages spoken in parts of northeastern Siberia and the Russian Far East. They are not known to have any genetic relationship to each other; their only common link is that they are held to have antedated the more dominant languages, particularly Tungusic and latterly Turkic languages, that have largely displaced them. Even more recently, Turkic (at least in Siberia) and especially Tungusic have been displaced in their turn by Russian.

Classifications
Four small language families and isolates are usually considered to be Paleo-Siberian languages:

 The Chukotko-Kamchatkan family, sometimes known as Luoravetlan, includes Chukchi and its close relatives, Koryak, Alutor and Kerek. Itelmen, also known as Kamchadal, is also distantly related. Chukchi, Koryak and Alutor are spoken in easternmost Siberia by communities numbering in the thousands (Chukchi) or hundreds (Koryak and Alutor). Kerek is extinct, and Itelmen is now spoken by fewer than 5 people, mostly elderly, on the west coast of the Kamchatka Peninsula.
 Nivkh (Gilyak, Amuric) consists of two or three languages spoken in the lower Amur basin and on the northern half of Sakhalin island. It has a recent modern literature.
 The Yeniseian languages were a small family formerly spoken on the middle Yenisei River and its tributaries, but are now represented only by Ket, spoken in the Turukhansk district of Krasnoyarsk Krai by no more than 200 people.
 Yukaghir is spoken in two mutually unintelligible varieties in the lower Kolyma and Indigirka valleys. Other languages, including Chuvantsy, spoken further inland and further east, are now extinct. Yukaghir is held by some to be related to the Uralic languages.

On  the basis of morphological, typological, and lexical evidence, Michael Fortescue suggests that Chukotko-Kamchatkan and Nivkh (Amuric) are related, forming a larger Chukotko-Kamchatkan–Amuric language family. Fortescue does not consider Yeniseian and Yukaghir to be genetically related to Chukotko-Kamchatkan–Amuric.

Relationships
The purpose of the existence of Paleosiberian itself lies in its practicability and remains a grouping of convenience for a variety of unclassifiable languages isolates located in Northeast Eurasia. Some proposals for the relationship of languages located within the Paleosiberian group have been made by some scholars, including Edward Vajda, who suggests them to be related to the Na-Dené and Eskimo–Aleut families of Alaska and northern Canada. This would correlate with the widespread idea that North America's aboriginal peoples migrated from present-day Siberia and other regions of Asia when the two continents were joined during the last ice age.

Ket, or more precisely the now largely extinct Yeniseian family, has been linked to the Na-Dené languages of North America. Dené–Yeniseian has been called "the first demonstration of a genealogical link between Old World and New World language families that meets the standards of traditional comparative-historical linguistics". In the past, attempts to connect it to Sino-Tibetan, North Caucasian and Burushaski have been made.

Kim Bang-han proposed that placename glosses in the Samguk sagi reflect the original language of the Korean peninsula and a component in the formation of both Korean and Japanese. It is suggested that this language was related to Nivkh in some form.
Juha Janhunen suggests the possibility that similar consonant stop systems in Koreanic and Nivkh may be due to ancient contact. Martine Robbeets suggests that Proto-Korean had a Nivkh substrate influence. Further parallel developments in their sound inventory (Old to Middle Korean and Proto-Nivkh to Nivkh) as well as commonalities in the syntax between Koreanic and Nivkh specifically have been observed.

The Ob-Ugric and Samoyedic languages predate the spread of Turkic, Mongolic and Tungusic languages, but are part of the well established larger Uralic family, thus not Paleosiberian. Yukaghir has often been suggested as a more distant relative of Uralic as part of the Uralic-Yukaghir languages, as well as Eskimo-Aleut as part of the Uralo-Siberian languages. However, these hypotheses are controversial and not universally accepted.

Vocabulary comparison
Below are selected basic vocabulary items in proto-languages reconstructed for Paleosiberian languages and language families. Proto-Yeniseian, Proto-Uralic, Proto-Ainu, Ainu, Proto-Korean and Proto-Japanese are also given for comparison.

Notes: C = Proto-Chukotian; I = Proto-Inuit

See also
Ostyak, a Russian name for indigenous languages of Siberia
Uralo-Siberian languages
Eurasiatic languages
Dene-Yeniseian languages

Notes

Further reading

External links

Вернер Г. К. Палеоазиатские языки // Лингвистический энциклопедический словарь. — М.: СЭ, 1990. 

 
History of Northeast Asia